Manuel Rubén Abimael Guzmán Reynoso (3 December 1934 − 11 September 2021), also known by his nom de guerre Chairman Gonzalo, was a Peruvian Maoist revolutionary and guerrilla leader, considered a terrorist by various governments during his lifetime. He founded the organization Communist Party of Peru – Shining Path (PCP-SL) in 1969 and led a rebellion against the Peruvian government until his capture by authorities in 12 September 1992. He was subsequently sentenced to life imprisonment for terrorism and treason.

In the 1960s and 1970s, Guzmán was a professor of philosophy active in left-wing revolutionary politics and strongly influenced by Marxism, Leninism, and Maoism. He developed an ideology of armed struggle stressing the empowerment of the Indigenous people. He went underground in the mid-1970s to become the leader of the Shining Path, which began "The People's War" or the "Armed Struggle" on 17 May 1980.

Early life 

He was the illegitimate son of a well-off merchant, who had eight children by five different women. Guzmán's mother, Berenice Reynoso, died when he was five.

At Arequipa, Guzmán completed bachelor's degrees in philosophy and law. His dissertations were titled The Kantian Theory of Space and The Bourgeois Democratic State. In 1962, Guzmán was recruited as a professor of philosophy by the rector of San Cristóbal of Huamanga University in Ayacucho, a city in the central Peruvian Andes. The rector was Dr. Efraín Morote Best, an anthropologist who some believe later became the true intellectual leader of the "Shining Path movement." Encouraged by Morote, Guzmán studied Quechua, the language spoken by Peru's Indigenous population, and became increasingly active in left-wing political circles.

In 1965, Guzman attended a cadre training course in China, returning to Lima and taking a leave of absence from his professorship to focus on party activism. In April 1967, Guzman led his fraction of the PCP to an international meeting in Albania, and would return to China between August and September of that same year. This placed him in China during the Cultural Revolution, which made a large impression on him.

He attracted several like-minded young academics committed to bringing about revolution in Peru. Guzmán was arrested twice during the 1970s because of his participation in violent riots in the city of Arequipa against the government of presidents Velasco Alvarado and Belaunde Terry. He visited the People's Republic of China with his then-wife Augusta La Torre for the first time in 1965. After serving as the head of personnel for San Cristóbal of Huamanga University, Guzmán left the institution in the mid-1970s and went underground.

In the 1960s, the Peruvian Communist Party had splintered over ideological and personal disputes. Guzmán, who had taken a pro-Chinese rather than pro-Soviet line, emerged as the leader of the faction which came to be known as the "Shining Path" (Mariátegui wrote once: "Marxism–Leninism is the shining path of the future"). Guzmán adopted the nom de guerre Presidente or Comrade Gonzalo and began advocating a peasant-led revolution on the Maoist model. His followers declared Guzmán, who cultivated anonymity, to be the "Fourth Sword of Communism" (after Marx, Lenin, and Mao). In his political declarations, Guzmán praised Mao's development of Lenin's thesis regarding "the role of imperialism" in propping up the "bourgeois capitalist system". He claimed that imperialism ultimately "creates disruption and is unsuccessful, and it will end up in ruins in the next 50 to 100 years". Guzmán applied this criticism not only to U.S. imperialism, but also Soviet imperialism, to what he termed as "social-imperialism" (in accoradance with the Chinese stance after the Sino-Soviet split).

In February 1964, he married Augusta La Torre, who was instrumental in founding Shining Path. She died under unclear circumstances in 1988. Guzmán and Elena Iparraguirre, a long-time lieutenant of Guzmán's and his lover, have both refused to talk about La Torre's fate since their imprisonments. In the fall of 2006, while in prison, Guzmán proposed to Iparraguirre, who is also serving a life sentence in a separate prison. After fighting for the permission to marry with a hunger strike, the couple wed in late August 2010.

Guzmán had always identified with atheism. He agreed with Karl Marx about religion as the "opium of the people", and viewed it as a "social phenomena product of the exploitation and that will extinguish while exploitation finishes to be swept and a new society arise". However, he pleaded respect for religious diversity and claimed religion would not be an obstacle for the armed struggle.

Insurgency

The Shining Path movement was at first largely confined to academic circles in Peruvian universities. In the late 1970s, however, the movement developed into a guerrilla group centered around Ayacucho. In May 1980, the group launched its war against the government of Peru by burning the ballot boxes in Chuschi, a village near Ayacucho, in an effort to disrupt the first democratic elections in the country since 1964. Shining Path eventually grew to control vast rural territories in central and southern Peru and achieved a presence even in the outskirts of Lima, where it staged numerous attacks. The purpose of Shining Path's campaign was to demoralize and undermine the government of Peru in order to create a situation conducive to a violent coup which would put its leaders in power. The Shining Path targeted not only the army and police, but also government employees at all levels, other leftist militants such as members of the Túpac Amaru Revolutionary Movement (MRTA), workers who did not participate in the strikes organized by the group, peasants who cooperated with the government in any way (including by voting in democratic elections), and middle-class inhabitants of Peru's main cities. The Truth and Reconciliation Commission later estimated that the resulting conflict led to the deaths of some seventy thousand people, approximately half of them at the hands of the Shining Path and a third at the hands of the state.

Initially Guzmán attempted to win over the support of citizens by punishing people they viewed as corrupt government officials and other unpopular leaders. However, Shining Path's increasingly brutal methods together with strictly imposed curfews, the prohibition of alcohol and an overall sense of insecurity and fear led to an increased popular reaction against the communist party. Eventually Guzmán's plan backfired as rural militia or "rondas" rallied support for the military against Shining Path. The very peasants Guzmán claimed to defend had turned against the Shining Path. This resulted in a cyclical state of violence in which Maoist guerillas embarked in ruthless punitive raids against Peruvian civilians living in the Andean region. In 1983, 69 people from the highland town of Lucanamarca were tortured and murdered by the Shining Path in what became known as the Lucanamarca massacre.

Guzmán's image as a dispassionate murderer became widespread after he moved against the city of Lima. After a series of bombings and selective assassinations the whole nation was shocked in 1992 when a car bomb exploded in one of Lima's busiest commercial districts on Tarata street, thus causing many casualties and enormous material losses. To his death, Guzmán denied responsibility for the Tarata bombing by claiming that it was carried out without his knowledge.

The movement promoted the writings of Guzmán, called "Gonzalo Thought", a new "theoretical understanding" that built upon Marxism, Leninism, and Maoism whereby he declared Maoism to be a "third and higher stage of Marxism," having defined Maoism as "people's war." In 1989, Guzmán declared that the Shining Path (which he referred to as the "Communist Party of Peru") had progressed from waging a people's war to waging a "war of movements." He further argued that this was a step towards achieving "strategic equilibrium" in the near future, based on Maoist theories of waging people's war. Guzmán claimed that such an equilibrium would manifest itself by ungovernability under the "old order." When that moment arrived, Guzmán believed that Shining Path would be ready to move on to its "strategic offensive".

Theodore Dalrymple, a conservative English journalist, has written that"the worst brutality I ever saw was that committed by Sendero Luminoso (Shining Path) in Peru, in the days when it seemed possible that it might come to power. If it had, I think its massacres would have dwarfed those of the Khmer Rouge. As a doctor, I am accustomed to unpleasant sights, but nothing prepared me for what I saw in Ayacucho, where Sendero first developed under the sway of a professor of philosophy, Abimael Guzmán."

Capture 

In 1992, during the first administration of President Alberto Fujimori, the National Directorate Against Terrorism (DIRCOTE) began surveillance on several residences in Lima because agents suspected that terrorists were using them as safehouses. One of those residences, in the upper-class neighborhood of Surco, had been operating as a ballet studio. The DIRCOTE operatives routinely searched the garbage taken out from the house. The house was supposedly inhabited by only one person, the dance teacher Maritza Garrido Lecca, but it was soon noticed that the household produced more garbage than one person could account for. Furthermore, agents found discarded tubes of cream for the treatment of psoriasis, an ailment that Guzmán was known to have. On 12 September 1992, an elite unit of the DIRCOTE carried out Operation Victoria, raiding the Surco residence. On the second floor of the house, they found and arrested Guzmán and eight others, including Laura Zambrano and Elena Iparraguirre, Guzmán's female companion.

Trials and imprisonment 
Guzmán was tried by a court of hooded military judges under provisions of articles 15 and 16 of Law 25475 adopted by Fujimori's government in May 1992 after April's constitutional crisis. After a three-day trial, Guzmán was sentenced to life imprisonment and incarcerated at the naval base on the island of San Lorenzo off the coast of Lima.

Subsequently, he was said to have negotiated with a presidential advisor at the time, Vladimiro Montesinos, in order to receive some benefits in exchange for helping the Peruvian government put an end to the Shining Path's militant activities. Guzmán appeared several times on Peruvian television and on 1 October 1993, he publicly declared "peace" with the Peruvian government. This declaration split the Shining Path and raised questions about the organization's future. About 6,000 guerrillas within the party accepted it as a sign of defeat and surrendered.

Guzmán's re-trial began on 5 November 2004. The international press was held in a sound-proof chamber and all media was banned from observing the trial after the Shining Path cadre turned their backs on the judges and delivered a revolutionary salute to the media gallery. The only words Guzmán spoke in the presence of the international press were "Long live the Communist Party of Peru! Glory to Marxism–Leninism–Maoism! Glory to the Peruvian people! Long live the heroes of the people’s war!" After he made this statement, the courtroom microphones were silenced and the press was unable to hear any of the proceedings that followed. When the trial resumed on 12 November, no reporters were allowed to observe the proceedings. Eventually two of the judges recused themselves and the trial ended in chaos. Guzmán's third trial began in September 2005 and was opened and closed amid a media blackout. No reporters were allowed to attend.

Sentence 
On 13 October 2006, Guzmán was sentenced to life in prison on charges of aggravated terrorism and murder. At his sentencing, three judges read the charges in a verdict that lasted more than six hours.

In 2014, Guzmán and his wife Iparraguirre were tried again, for the 1992 Tarata bombing in Lima in which 25 people died. On 11 September 2018, he was sentenced to a second life term in prison.

Guzmán was incarcerated in the maximum security prison of the naval base of Callao, the port of Lima, until his death in 2021. Fellow prisoners there include Víctor Polay, leader of the Túpac Amaru Revolutionary Movement, and Vladimiro Montesinos, the former head of the National Intelligence Service who supervised the construction of the prison and served under the (now also imprisoned) President Alberto Fujimori.

Death 
On 13 July 2021, he was attended by medical personnel of the Ministry of Health after he refused to eat. He was given blood tests and an ultrasound. A few days later, on 17 July, he was transferred to a hospital for further monitoring. He died on 11 September 2021 at the Maximum Safety Center of the Callao Naval Base, at the age of 86.

Guzmán's body was cremated on the dawn of 24 September 2021 and his ashes were dispersed in a secret location in order to prevent a shrine honoring him from being created.

References

Further reading
 Koppel, Martin. Peru's 'Shining Path' Evolution of a Stalinist Sect (1994)
 Lovell, Julia. Maoism: A Global History (2019) pp 306–346 on Peru.
 Palmer, David Scott. ed. The Shining Path of Peru (2nd ed 1994) excerpt
 Starn, Orin. "Maoism in the Andes: The Communist Party of Peru-Shining Path and the refusal of history." Journal of Latin American Studies 27.2 (1995): 399–421. online

1934 births
2021 deaths
Anti-revisionists
People convicted on terrorism charges
People from Arequipa
People imprisoned on charges of terrorism
Peruvian atheists
Peruvian criminals
Peruvian communists
Peruvian revolutionaries
Peruvian philosophers
Peruvian prisoners sentenced to life imprisonment
Prisoners sentenced to life imprisonment by Peru
National University of Saint Augustine alumni
Members of the Shining Path
Maoist theorists
Prisoners in San Lorenzo Island
People who died in prison custody
Deaths from skin cancer
Deaths from cancer in Peru
Anti-Americanism